Yamen is a town in the south of Xinhui District of Jiangmen, Guangdong, China.

History 
In 1279, the Battle of Yamen took place in the area between the navies of the Song dynasty and the Yuan dynasty.

In 1955, Yamen was placed under the jurisdiction of the now-defunct Anxi District. In 1958, Yamen was divided into Yaxi Township and Tongnan Township. In 1984, these became Yaxi District and Yanan District. Two years later, Yaxi and Yanan became towns. On June 22, 2002, the State Council of the People's Republic of China passed a law which changed Xinhui from a county-level city to a district, and merged Yaxi and Yanan into the town of Yamen.

Administrative divisions 

Yamen administers 2 residential communities and 17 administrative villages.

Residential communities 
The 2 residential communities governed by Yamen are Yaxi Community and Yanan Community.

Villages 
The following 17 administrative villages are governed by Yamen:

 Tianshui Village
 Huangchong Village
 Jingbei Village
 Jingmei Village
 Nanhe Village
 Dongnan Village
 Dongbei Village
 Shuibei Village
 Kengkou Village
 Jiaobeishi Village
 Tianbian Village
 Gudou Village
 Tiannan Village
 Hengshui Village
 Longwang Village
 Mingping Village
 Lianghuangwu Village

Demographics 
According to the 2000 Chinese Census, Yaxi and Yanan, the two former towns which comprise present-day Yamen, had populations of 29,634 and 11,971, respectively. Combined, these populations total 41,605.

Tourism 

Transportation 
 connects the town to neighboring .

See also
Battle of Yamen

References 

Xinhui District
Towns in Guangdong